Jeremiah Burroughs (sometimes Burroughes; 1599 – London, 13 November, 1646) was an English Congregationalist and a well-known Puritan preacher.

Biography
Burroughs studied at Emmanuel College, Cambridge, and was graduated M.A. in 1624, but left the university because of non-conformity. He was assistant to Edmund Calamy at Bury St. Edmunds, and in 1631 became rector of Tivetshall, Norfolk. He was  suspended for non-conformity in 1636 and soon afterward deprived, he went to Rotterdam (1637) and became "teacher" of the English church there. He returned to England in 1641 and served as preacher at Stepney and Cripplegate, London. He was a member of the Westminster Assembly and one of the few who opposed the Presbyterian majority. He was one of the Five Dissenting Brethren who put their names to the Independent manifesto, An Apologeticall Narration in early 1644. While one of the most distinguished of the English Independents, he was one of the most moderate, acting consistently in accordance with the motto on his study door (in Latin and Greek): "Opinionum varietas et opinantium unitas non sunt ασυστατα" ("Difference of belief and unity of believers are not inconsistent"). In 1646, Burroughs died from complications resulting from a fall from his horse on the way back from the Westminster Assembly.

Publications
Burroughs' publications were many, one of the most important being An Exposition with Practical Observations on the Prophecy of Hosea (4 vols., London, 1643–57), which, along with a number of his other works, has been recently reprinted:

Commentary on the Prophecy of Hosea
The Rare Jewel of Christian Contentment ( and )
Learning to be Happy
The Evil of Evils: The Exceeding Sinfulness of Sin
Hope
A Treatise on Earthly-Mindedness
The Excellency of a Gracious Spirit: Delivered in a Treatise on Numbers 14:24
Irenicum: Healing the Divisions Among God's People
The Saint's Happiness: Sermons on the Beatitudes ( and )
The Saint's Treasury: Being Sundry Sermons Preached in London
Gospel Worship, Or, the Right Manner of Sanctifying the Name of God
Gospel Fear
Gospel Conversation
Gospel Revelation
Gospel Remission
Gospel Reconciliation, Or, Christ's Trumpet of Peace to the World
The saints happinesse (1660)
https://archive.org/details/saintshappiness00greegoog

Further reading

References

External links

The Rare Jewel of Christian Contentment
"Christ Is All In All", an abridgement from The Saint's Treasury
"The Right Manner of Worship and Drawing Nigh Unto God", a sermon by Burroughs
A short biography of Burroughs
An audio course on Burroughs' The Rare Jewel of Christian Contentment
Free download of many of his works in digital format
The Jeremiah Burroughs Home Page
 

17th-century Congregationalist ministers
English Congregationalist ministers
English evangelicals
Westminster Divines
Alumni of Emmanuel College, Cambridge
English independent ministers of the Interregnum (England)
1600s births
1646 deaths
17th-century Calvinist and Reformed ministers